Coral Rapids is a community in Ontario, Canada. It is located on the Abitibi River northwest of Otter Rapids and has a station on the Ontario Northland's Polar Bear Express.

Communities in Cochrane District